The 33rd Golden Rooster Awards honoring best Chinese language films which presented during 2019–20. The award ceremony was held in Xiamen, China, and broadcast by CCTV-6.

Winners and nominees

References 

2020
2020 film awards